"Sucker DJ" (also known as "Sucker DJ's (I Will Survive)", or "Sucker DJ (A Witch for Love)") is a song by American rapper Dimples D. It was written by Buddy Kaye, Crystal Smith, Hugo Montenegro and Marlon Williams and originally released in 1983 by Party Time Records, without any success in the charts. In 1990, Dutch DJ and producer Ben Liebrand remixed the song, including a sample of the theme tune of American sitcom I Dream of Jeannie, written by Montenegro and Kaye.

After its re-release, the song became a hit in Europe, where it reached the top 10 in the Netherlands and number 17 in the United Kingdom. In Australia and New Zealand, it reached numbers one and two, respectively; in the first country, Dimples D. became the first female hip hop musician to achieve this milestone.

Background and development
"Sucker DJ" was originally written and produced by American rapper and record producer Marley Marl in 1983 for then-newcomer Crystal Smith, who released it under the pseudonym Dimples D. under Party Time Records, unsuccessfully.

In 1990 Dutch DJ Ben Liebrand created a remix of the song entitled "Genie Mix": for the new version, Liebrand used as a basis a sample of the theme music of the sitcom I Dream of Jeannie, written by Hugo Montenegro. The remix was then released on July 11 of the same year.

Commercial performance
Following the release of the remix, the song achieved success in various countries. In Europe, it reached number eight in the Netherlands, number 10 in Austria, number 16 in Germany, and number 17 on the UK Singles Chart. In Oceania, it reached the top of the Australian Singles Chart and peaked at number two in New Zealand. Dimples D.'s subsequent singles did not match "Sucker DJ"'s results, making the song a one-hit wonder; she retired from the stage a few years later.

Charts

Weekly charts

Year-end charts

Certifications

References

External links
 

1983 debut singles
1983 songs
1990 singles
Number-one singles in Australia
Songs written by Marley Marl